Pelly Crossing Airport  is located  northeast of Pelly Crossing, Yukon, Canada.

Pelly Crossing Airport is standalone airport with no lights or supporting buildings. Access to or from the North Klondike Highway (Yukon Highway #2) requires contacting the Pelly Crossing Royal Canadian Mounted Police.

References

Registered aerodromes in Yukon